Yoga schools are as diverse as the meanings of the bracket term yoga. Within the major branches of yoga such as haṭha, lāya, rāja, jñāna, and bhakti there are many different schools and lineages, both extant and defunct. Since the late 19th century, a great number of distinct new styles of "Yoga" have been introduced by individual teachers. Some schools and traditions are occasionally referred to as yoga or yogic for their similar practices, despite having no foundation in the Indian tradition; these include Shin Shin Tōitsu-dō, and Daoyin.

Modern Hinduism and Neo-Hindu revival 

The term "Yoga" has been used for various philosophies and concepts in the context of Hindu revivalism and Neo-Hindu religious and philosophical movements.

 1918: The Yoga Institute - Shri Yogendra
 1920: Agni Yoga - Nicholas Roerich and his wife Helena Roerich (theosophy)
 1920: Self-Realization Fellowship - Paramahansa Yogananda
 1921: Integral Yoga - Sri Aurobindo, The Synthesis of Yoga
 1948: Divine Life Society - Swami Sivananda
 1950s: Satyananda Yoga - Swami Satyananda Saraswati
 1955: Ananda Marga - Shrii Shrii Anandamurti
 1960s: Transcendental Meditation - Maharishi Mahesh Yogi
 1970: Bikram Yoga - Bikram Choudhury
 1971: Himalayan Institute of Yoga Science and Philosophy - Swami Rama
 1970s: Siddha Yoga - Swami Muktananda
 1970s: Sahaja Yoga, a new religious movement founded by Nirmala Srivastava
 1981: Art of Living - Ravi Shankar
 1991: Shiva Yoga – Shankarananda
 1997: Ananda yoga - Swami Kriyananda

Styles of yoga as exercise 

India and other Asian countries are home to thousands of yoga schools founded over the last century to teach yoga as exercise, which unlike all earlier forms consists in large part of asanas. Below are some and their style of yoga.

 1948: Ashtanga Vinyasa Yoga - Sri K. Pattabhi Jois 
 1963: Bihar School of Yoga - Swami Satyananda Saraswati
 1960s: Sivananda Yoga - Swami Vishnu-devananda
 1960s: Iyengar Yoga - B.K.S. Iyengar
 1970s: Yin Yoga - Paulie Zink
 1971: Bikram Yoga - Bikram Choudhury
 1980s: Viniyoga - tradition of Tirumalai Krishnamacharya
 1980s: Rocket Yoga - Larry Schultz
 1982: Forrest Yoga - Ana T. Forrest
 1986: Jivamukti Yoga - David Life and Sharon Gannon
 1992: Isha Yoga - Sadhguru Jaggi Vasudev
 1995: Power Yoga - Beryl Bender Birch
 1990s: Power Yoga - Bryan Kest
 1997: Anusara Yoga - formerly John Friend

Eclectic styles 

Several eclectic styles, some with Western audiences, are partially based on Hatha yoga:

 1969: Kundalini Yoga - Yogi Bhajan
 1975: Zen Yoga
 1985: Body & Brain ("Korean Yoga") - Ilchi Lee
 1995: Laughter Yoga - Madan Kataria

Yoga in other religious traditions 

With the widespread reception of the concept of "Yoga" in the west, the term has also been transferred to similar systems of meditation and exercise which are not of Indian origin, mostly without global reach:

 Tsa lung Trul khor, a concept in Tibetan Buddhism described as "Yantra Yoga" by Chogyal Namkhai Norbu (2000)
 Kum Nye, Tibetan practice, sometimes dubbed "Kum Nye Yoga"
 Shin Shin Tōitsu-dō, a system of "mind and body unification" created by Nakamura Tempu in the 1940s which is also known as "Japanese Yoga".
 Daoyin is a similar Daoist practice in China, part of a broader meditation system which includes Qigong and Taijiquan
 Kemetic yoga, an ancient Egyptian yoga system

References 

 
 
Yoga schools
Yoga schools